is a private university in Okayama, Okayama, Japan. The predecessor of the school was founded in 1911, and it was chartered as a university in 1965.

External links
 Official website 

Educational institutions established in 1911
Private universities and colleges in Japan
Okayama
Universities and colleges in Okayama Prefecture
1911 establishments in Japan